Charlotte Kerr (29 May 1927 – 28 December 2011) was a German director, film producer, actress, writer and journalist.

She first performed on stage in Fritz Kortner’s version of Schiller’s Don Carlos in 1951.

In 1971, she was a member of the jury at the 21st Berlin International Film Festival.

In 1983, during the filming of a film about the Greek minister Melina Mercouri, Kerr met the Swiss poet Friedrich Dürrenmatt. They became close after discussing his latest play Achterloo and were married in 1984. The two collaborated on the film Portrait eines Planeten and the play Rollenspiele. Dürrenmatt died in 1990. Her autobiography,  discussed her life with the writer. In 2000, her Centre Dürrenmatt was opened in Neuchâtel.

She took legal action against the writer Hugo Loetscher for an alleged affront of her dignity and personal rights in his book about Dürrenmatt's death and funeral, which was released 13 years after Dürrenmatt's death and published by Lesen statt Klettern.

She died on 28 December 2011 in a hospital in Bern.

Filmography 
Carnival in White (1952) - Peggy Swenson
Dein Mund verspricht mir Liebe (1954)
Heldinnen (1960, screenplay)
The Miracle of Father Malachia (1961) - Dr. Renate Kellinghus
Raumpatrouille (1966, TV series) - General Lydia van Dyke
Heißer Sand auf Sylt (1968) - Frau Bergmann
Peter und Sabine (1968) - Frauenärztin
Mattanza - Ein Liebestraum (1969) - Geraldine
Deine Zärtlichkeiten (1969) - Mutter
Alexander Zwo (1972–1973, TV miniseries) - Maud
Temptation in the Summer Wind (1972)
Only the Wind Knows the Answer (1974) - Hilde Hellmann
 (1977) - Prosecutor
 (1978, TV film) - Anna Ferroli
Fleisch (1979, TV film) - Dr. Jackson
Swann in Love (1984) - Sous-maitresse
Raumpatrouille Orion – Rücksturz ins Kino (2003) - General Lydia van Dyke (archive footage)

References

External links

German documentary film directors
German women film directors
German film actresses
German television actresses
German stage actresses
German theatre directors
1927 births
2011 deaths
Film people from Frankfurt
Journalists from Frankfurt
German autobiographers
20th-century German actresses
21st-century German actresses
Friedrich Dürrenmatt
Women autobiographers